Pall Mall is a small unincorporated community in the Wolf River valley of Fentress County, Tennessee, United States.  It is named after Pall Mall, London. Pall Mall is located near the Kentucky-Tennessee state-line in northeastern-central Tennessee. The population was at 1,398 people according to the 2000 census.

Notable people
The World War I hero Alvin York was raised in Pall Mall. His son Andrew Jackson York (1930–2022) lived in the town. York is commemorated at the Sgt. Alvin C. York State Historic Park in Pall Mall, which includes the family farmhouse and grist mill. York is buried at Wolf River Cemetery in Pall Mall.

Other notable natives of Pall Mall include U.S. Representative Lincoln Davis and fugitive Billy Dean Anderson.

Notes

External links
Sgt. Alvin C. York State Historic Park web site

Unincorporated communities in Fentress County, Tennessee
Unincorporated communities in Tennessee